Acrobasis aurorella is a species of snout moth in the genus Acrobasis. It was described by Charles Russell Ely in 1910, and is known from the eastern United States.

References

Moths described in 1910
Acrobasis
Moths of North America